Interstate 40 (I-40) is a major east–west Interstate Highway in the United States, stretching from Barstow, California, to Wilmington, North Carolina. The segment of I-40 in California is sometimes called the Needles Freeway. It goes east from its western terminus at I-15 in Barstow across the Mojave Desert in San Bernardino County past the Clipper Mountains to Needles, before it crosses over the Colorado River into Arizona east of Needles. All  of I-40 in California are in San Bernardino County.

Route description

I-40 goes through the Mojave Desert on the entirety of its run through California. The highway starts its eastward journey at a junction with I-15 in Barstow. The freeway passes through Marine Corps Logistics Base Barstow before leaving the city limits. I-40 provides access to the town of Daggett but passes south of the town. After passing south of the Barstow-Daggett Airport, I-40 goes through Newberry Springs and Ludlow before traveling along the south end of Mojave National Preserve. Several miles east of the preserve, I-40 intersects U.S. Route 95 (US 95), and the two highways run concurrently into the city of Needles. In Needles, US 95 continues south while I-40 continues east through Mojave National Preserve and across the Colorado River into Arizona.

I-40 is part of the California Freeway and Expressway System and is part of the National Highway System, a network of highways that are considered essential to the country's economy, defense, and mobility by the Federal Highway Administration. I-40 is eligible for the State Scenic Highway System, but it is not officially designated as a scenic highway by the California Department of Transportation. I-40 from I-15 to the Arizona state line is known as the Needles Freeway, as named by Senate Concurrent Resolution 1 in 1968.

History
In 1957, the California Department of Highways proposed that the route be numbered as I-30 because of the already existing US 40 in the state. However, this was rejected, and, eventually, US 40 was decommissioned in favor of I-80.

Today, the Needles Freeway replaced the former US 66 across the Mojave Desert. As a result, a number of communities along the former route, like Amboy, have become ghost-towns.

In the early 1960s, a proposal as part of Project Plowshare would have detonated 22 nuclear explosions to excavate a massive roadcut through the Bristol Mountains to accommodate a better alignment of I-40 and a new rail line. This proposal was definitively abandoned in 1968.

A sign at that start of I-40 in Barstow showing the distance to Wilmington, North Carolina, had been stolen several times.

Exit list

Related routes
California does not have any auxiliary Interstate Highways associated with I-40.

There is one I-40 business loop in Needles, providing access to downtown Needles as Broadway (Historic Route 66). As such, it also follows the former routing of US 66.

See also

References

External links

 Interstate 40 @ Interstate-Guide.com
 Interstate 40 Business @ Interstate-Guide.com
 Interstate 40 at California @ AARoads.com
 Interstate 40 highway conditions from Caltrans
 Interstate 40 at California Highways

40
Southern California freeways
Roads in San Bernardino County, California
 California